The Anglican Province of Owerri is one of the 14 ecclesiastical provinces of the Church of Nigeria. It comprises 12 dioceses:

Okigwe South (Bishop:David Onuoha)
Owerri (Bishop: Chukwuma Oparah)
Orlu (Bishop: Benjamin Chinedum Okeke)
Mbaise (Bishop: Chamberlain Chinedu Ogunedo)
Isi Mbano (Bishop: Godson Udochukwu Ukanwa)
Ideato (Bishop: Henry Okeke)
Egbu (Bishop: Geoffrey Okoroafor)
Ohaji/Egbema (Bishop: Chidi Collins Oparaojiaku)
On the Lake (Bishop: Chijioke Oti)
Oru (Bishop: Geoffrey Chukwunenye)
Okigwe (Bishop: Edward Osuegbu)
Ikeduru (Bishop: Emmanuel Maduwike)

Archbishops of the Province
Bennett Okoro, Bishop of Orlu (re-elected 2007)
2020–present: David Onuoha, Bishop of Okigwe

References

 
Church of Nigeria ecclesiastical provinces